The 1970–71 season of the Lion Shield was the second season of top flight association football competition in Tonga.  Kolofo'ou No.1
won the championship, their second successive title.

References

Tonga Major League seasons
Tonga
Football
Tonga
Football